The International Symposium on Alcohol Fuels (ISAF) is a non-profit international organization which gathers together specialists, technologists, executives and technical experts from alcohol, alcohol fuels, methanol, ethers and bio-fuel industries. ISAF came into being in 1976. The 2011 meeting (ISAF-XIX) was held in Verona, Italy. Subsequent conferences were held in Gwangju, Korea in 2015; Cartagena, Colombia in 2016; and Hangzhou, China in 2018.

History
ISAF brings together technologists, technical experts, technology providers and executives in fields pertaining to the  alcohol fuel industry, who share their ideas and consider solutions to the challenges ahead. ISAF discusses substitute energy sources like alcohol fuels and other alternative fuels like methanol, ethers, etc. ISAF furthers the cause of research, development and utilization of alcohol fuels to accelerate the exploitation of clean alternate fuels for vehicles and to reduce environmental pollution both from industrial and motor sources.

Reports and handbooks of the ISAF are frequently cited in scholarly articles and treatises about methanol and similar fuels.

Conferences

ISAF symposia have been held in all the continents:

 Africa: South Africa
 Americas: Canada, Brazil, United States of America, Colombia
 Asia: China, Japan, Thailand, India, Korea
 Europe: Germany, France, Italy, Sweden
 Oceania: New Zealand

ISAF XVII was held in Taiyuan China in 2008. The ISAF Symposium is held every two years.

The theme of ISAF XVIII 2010 was "Innovation for local and global sustainability of alcohol fuels." Delegates discussed methodologies and technologies for production of alcohol fuels, and control of environmental pollution.

See also

 Energy law
 Energy policy

References

External links
 ISAF XVIII 2010 website

International energy organizations
Organizations established in 1976
Alcohol fuels